Out of the Past Into the Future is the title of the studio album by the female vocal group The Three Degrees, featuring their revisited hits and new material. It was released in 1993, and was produced by Ralf Stemmann and Christian De Walden (Marta Sanchez).
It features a cover version of Brigitte Nielsen's song "Give Me A Chance", from her album I'm The One... Nobody Else. Three tracks were provided by Thomas Anders (of Modern Talking fame) aka Chris Copperfield. Two tracks were released in Europe, "Dirty Ol' Man" (with the Ian Levine Club Mix) and "Hurry, Hurry" as singles.

In 1994 the album was re-released in Japan. It has never been released in the UK.

Track listing
 "TSOP (The Sound of Philadelphia)" / "My Simple Heart" (medley) (Kenneth Gamble, Leon Huff / Dominic Bugatti, Frank Musker) — 4:18
 "Dirty Ol' Man" (Kenneth Gamble, Leon Huff) — 3:44
 "When Will I See You Again" (Kenneth Gamble, Leon Huff) — 4:01
 "Woman in Love" (Dominic Bugatti, Frank Musker) — 4:30
 "Take Good Care of Yourself" (Kenneth Gamble, Leon Huff) — 3:36
 "I'm Thru With Him" (Lenny Macaluso, Phyllis Molinary) — 4:21
 "If You Don’t Want My Love" (Kathy Jiles, Johnny Jacobs) — 4:00
 "Hurry, Hurry" (Mark Anderson, Lisa Raggio, Stacy Widelitz) — 3:36
 "Emotional Thing" (Chris Copperfield, Christian De Walden, Ralf Stemmann, Mike Shepstone) — 4:07
 "Give Me A Chance" (Brigitte Nielsen, Christian De Walden, Ralf Stemmann, Bernadette Jones) — 3:36
 "Question of Love" (Chris Copperfield, Margaret Harris, Ralf Stemmann) — 3:58
 "Ain't No Woman" (Chris Copperfield, Ralf Stemmann, Mike Shepstone) — 3:52

The Japanese version of this album had the bonus track "Dirty 'Ol Man" (12" Club Mix) which was remixed by UK DJ and remixer Ian Levine.

Personnel
 Produced and arranged by: Christian De Walden and Ralf Stemmann
 Co-Produced by and engineered by: Walter Clissen
 Recorded at Flamingo Café Recording Studio, Studio City, California
 Mixed at Enterprise Studios, North Hollywood, California
 Engineered and mixed by: Walter Clissen, assisted by John Schmidt
 Digitally mastered by: Chris Bellman at Bernie Grundman Mastering, Hollywood, California
 Art Direction: Thomas Sassenbach
 Photos: Bernhard Kuehmstedt

Musicians
 The Three Degrees (Valerie Holiday, Helen Scott-Leggins, Cynthia "Cindy" Garrison) - vocals
 Ralf Stemmann - Synclavier programming
 Ralf Stemmann, Randy Kerber - keyboards
 Randy Kerber, Larry Steelman - acoustic piano
 Paul Jackson, Jr., James Harrah - guitar
 Bob Parr - bass
 Doug Norwine - saxophone and flute solos
 "The Heart Attack" Bill Bergman, Greg Smith, Les Lovett, Dennis Farias, Nick Lane - horns
 Paulinho Da Costa - percussion
 LA Express Strings - string ensemble

See also
Thomas Anders – When Will I See You Again (1993)

References

The Three Degrees albums
1993 albums